Subic, officially the Municipality of Subic, is a 1st class municipality in the province of Zambales, Philippines. According to the 2020 census, it has a population of 111,912 people.

It is located along the northern coast of Subic Bay. Portions of the town also form part of the Subic Freeport Zone.

Etymology
The native Zambales inhabitants called the area Hubek, which means "head of a plough"; Spanish missionary priests mispronounced the name as Subiq. By the time of the American occupation, "Subiq" was mispronounced as Subig. Eventually, the name reverted to "Subiq", but the letter 'q' was replaced with 'c'.

History
In 1572, Juan de Salcedo, the Mexico-born Spanish conquistador and grandson of Miguel Lopez de Legazpi, founded Zambales during his exploration of northern Luzon. Subic was founded in late 1607 by Augustinian friars headed by Rev. Fr. Rodrigo de San Miguel, and the natives in Subic were Christianized under Spanish rule.

Spanish period
In September 1762, the British invaded the Philippines and took over the Spanish main naval base in Manila Bay.  This prompted the Spanish military to scout for the next promising naval station. The expedition returned with the good news for the naval command - a natural bounty and deep waters at Subic Bay. King Alfonso XII issued a decree in 1884 that declared Subic as "a naval port and the property appertaining there to set aside for naval purposes." Construction of an arsenal and ship repair yard ensued March 8 the following year, as ordered by the new settlers' Naval Commission. Subic Bay's potential as naval station was realized by the Americans. Commodore George Dewey and his men engaged in a battle that destroyed the Spanish Army in 1898, and the Americans took over Subic Bay on December 10, 1899.

American period and World War II
The Americans designated the Subic Bay area as a repair and supply naval base site in 1901. Two years later, US President Theodore Roosevelt declared  of land in Subic as a military reservation area; or more than half of Subic's land area at the time. Subic, along with the Olongapo area suffered significant damage during the World War II and was repurposed by the Imperial Japanese Army as their own base during the Japanese occupation.

Post World War II
After World War II, Olongapo, a barrio of Subic that forms part of the US Military Reservations in the Subic area, was turned over to the Philippine government. Olongapo was converted to a municipality independent from Subic town through Executive Order No. 366 issued by President Carlos P. Garcia on December 7, 1959.

Geography

Climate
Subic has a tropical monsoon climate (Köppen climate classification Am). Subic's climate is no different from the other towns in eastern part of Luzon where rainy season runs from May to October, while the dry season is from November to April.

Barangays 
Subic is politically subdivided into 16 barangays.

 Aningway-Sacatihan
 Asinan (Poblacion)
 Asinan Proper
 Baraca-Camachile (Poblacion)
 Batiawan
 Calapacuan
 Calapandayan (Poblacion)
 Cawag
 Ilwas (Poblacion)
 Mangan-Vaca
 Matain
 Naugsol
 Pamatawan
 San Isidro
 Santo Tomas
 Wawandue (Poblacion)

Government

Chief executives 

This is the complete list of municipal leaders such as Mayor and Presidente Municipal since it became a municipality in 1902.

Demographics

Economy 

Part of the town of Subic are within the jurisdiction of the Subic Freeport Zone which is managed by the Subic Bay Metropolitan Authority. The revenue earned by the special economic zone is shared by seven municipalities including Subic town, and the city of Olongapo.

Infrastructure

Transportation

Roads 

The primary road that connects Subic to the other parts of the town is the Olongapo-Bugallon Road. Most of the names of Subic's streets are based on the surnames of prominent residents or names of plants. Most of the roads in Subic are made of concrete and asphalt while others are still made of dirt.

Bypass roads such as the Govic Highway are also commonly used by motorists to travel from Barangay Matain to Barangay Manggahan. The roads are meant to reduce traffic in the town proper and are used by trucks going north of Castillejos and vice versa.

Another main road is the Philseco Road that ends from Barangay Asinan proper down to Keppel Subic Shipyard (formerly Philippine Shipyard and Engineering Corporation). The Govic Highway Extension runs from Castillejos down to Hanjin Shipyard and is exclusively used by its workers.

Public Utilities

Electricity 
Electricity services are provided by the cooperative-run Zambales II Electric Cooperative, Inc. (ZAMECO II) which covers an area from Subic all the way to Cabangan since 1972.

Water 
Water services are provided by Subic Water District (SWD), not to be confused with Subic Water and Sewerage Company (Subic Water), which is a different water distribution company serving the neighboring city of Olongapo.

Education

High school 

Private
Smart Achievers Academy Subic Incorporated
 College of Subic Montessori
 St. James School
 St. Anthony's School

Public
 Subic National High School
Kinabuksan Integrated School
 Ilwas Integrated School
 Josephine F. Khonghun Special Education Center
 Nagyantok National High School
 Pamatawan Integrated School
 Santo Tomas National High School
 Calapandayan Integrated School

College 
 College of Subic Montessori
 Best Freeport College
 Metro Subic College
 Kolehiyo ng Subic (Public College)
Most of Private schools are operated by Catholic Institution except for colleges.

See also
Subic Bay Freeport Zone
Port of Subic

References

External links

 Subic Profile at PhilAtlas.com
 
 [ Philippine Standard Geographic Code]

Municipalities of Zambales
Port cities and towns in the Philippines
Beaches of the Philippines